Brian Kenrick Tucker  (born 6 February 1959) is an Australian former cyclist. He competed at the 1980 Summer Olympics and the 1984 Summer Olympics.

References

External links
 

1959 births
Living people
Australian male cyclists
Olympic cyclists of Australia
Cyclists at the 1980 Summer Olympics
Cyclists at the 1984 Summer Olympics
Place of birth missing (living people)
Commonwealth Games medallists in cycling
Commonwealth Games gold medallists for Australia
Commonwealth Games silver medallists for Australia
Cyclists at the 1978 Commonwealth Games
Cyclists at the 1982 Commonwealth Games
Recipients of the Medal of the Order of Australia
Medallists at the 1978 Commonwealth Games
Medallists at the 1982 Commonwealth Games